is a railway station in the city of Takasaki, Gunma, Japan, operated by the East Japan Railway Company (JR East).

Lines
It is also served by through services to and from the Agatsuma Line and the Ryōmō Line.

Station layout
The station consists of two opposed side platforms serving two tracks, connected to the station building by a footbridge. It has a Midori no Madoguchi staffed ticket office.

Platforms

History
The station opened on 20 December 1957. Upon the privatization of the Japanese National Railways (JNR) on 1 April 1987, it came under the control of JR East.

Passenger statistics
In fiscal 2019, the station was used by an average of 2155 passengers daily (boarding passengers only).

Surrounding area
 
 Takasaki Ino Post Office

See also
 List of railway stations in Japan

References

External links

 Ino Station information (JR East) 

Railway stations in Gunma Prefecture
Takasaki Line
Railway stations in Japan opened in 1957
Stations of East Japan Railway Company
Takasaki, Gunma